Albert Kriemler  (born 1960) is a Swiss fashion designer, and creative director at Swiss fashion company Akris.

Biography
Albert Kriemler began at Akris in 1980. At Akris, Kriemler has continued St. Gallen's textile-based history by hiring local artisans. Work demands that Albert travels nearly four months a year, but his professional and personal base is still in St. Gallen.

Kriemler has collaborated with ballet choreographer John Neumeier by designing the costumes for the ensemble of Neumeier's 2005/06 production with the Vienna Philharmonic and the Hamburg ballet's 2008 production of “The Legend of Joseph”. In his cohort are not many actresses or socialites, but a cultured mix of artistic personalities including architects Pierre de Meuron, Jacques Herzog and Sou Fujimoto, artist Thomas Ruff, who inspired the fall 2014 collection with his night photographs and many others. In 2009, Kriemler created the brand's first handbag collection of horsehair fabric.

Honors
Kriemler received the Grand Prix Design prize by the Swiss Federal Office of Culture in 2008 and awarded with the Swiss Design Award for his achievements as the “most important international ambassador for fashion creation in design.”   He was named the honoree for fashion design at the 2010 Fashion Group International Awards in New York.

References

https://revoir.tv5monde.com/toutes-les-videos/art-de-vivre/demo-de-mode-a-k-r-i-s

External links
 Akris official website

Swiss fashion designers
Living people
1960 births